Kent Warnock (born June 3, 1964) is a defensive line coach for the Calgary Dinos of U Sports football and he is a former professional Canadian football defensive lineman who played for eight seasons for the Calgary Stampeders and BC Lions. He was drafted first overall in the 1986 CFL Draft by the Stampeders and won a Grey Cup championship with the team in 1992. He went to Lord Beaverbrook High School in Calgary, Alberta and played CIAU football for the Dinos where he won Vanier Cup championships in 1983 and 1985.

References

1964 births
Living people
Players of Canadian football from New Brunswick
Canadian football defensive linemen
Sportspeople from Saint John, New Brunswick
Calgary Dinos football players
Calgary Stampeders players
BC Lions players
Calgary Dinos football coaches